Ocean Park is an MTR rapid transit station in Hong Kong on the eastern section of the , which serves Ocean Park Hong Kong and Wong Chuk Hang. It opened on 28 December 2016 with the rest of the South Island line.

The station is built above ground, north of Ocean Park Road, above the Ocean Park Bus Depot. A footbridge links the station with the park entrance. In total, the station features three entrances/exits.

History
The station was constructed under a contract numbered 903, which included the construction of both Ocean Park and Wong Chuk Hang stations as well as the Aberdeen Channel Bridge. The contract was awarded to Leighton Asia in May 2011.

Ocean Park station opened on 28 December 2016.

Station layout

This elevated station has two tracks and two side platforms. Aedas, as part of the engineering team led by Atkins, is the architect for the station. The station was completed in October 2015, but opened with the rest of the South Island line East on 28 December 2016.

The station features different shades of blue glass, in wavy tile bands, as the main decoration. About  of the concourse will be coloured blue, the pillars adorned with depictions of seals, penguins, jellyfish and dolphins and other marine life. On the ceiling is Flow, a hanging art installation created by Benson Kwun; this installation resembles a school of fish swimming through the air. Ocean Park is the second MTR station serving a theme park, after .

A park-and-ride facility is adjacent to the station.

Entrances/exits 
Ocean Park station has three entrances/exits:
 A: Ocean Park Public Transport Interchange, Ocean Park Road, Nam Fung Road  (1 lift)
 B: Footbridge to Ocean Park Hong Kong main entrance 
 C: Wong Chuk Hang Road, to Shouson Hill  (1 lift)

References

MTR stations on Hong Kong Island
South Island line
Wong Chuk Hang